Wolf Creek State Park is an Illinois state park on  in Shelby County, Illinois, United States.

2009 reopening
Wolf Creek State Park is located on the east side of Lake Shelbyville.  It has 304 Class A campsites with restrooms and showers, electricity and picnic tables.  There are also two family tent camping areas, an organized group camp, and an equestrian campground.  There is also one cabin available for rent.

2008 closing
Wolf Creek State Park was one of eleven state parks slated to close indefinitely on November 1, 2008, due to budget cuts by then-Illinois Governor Rod Blagojevich. After delay, which restored funding for some of the parks, a proposal to close seven state parks and a dozen state historic sites, including Wolf Creek State Park, went ahead on November 30, 2008. After the impeachment of Illinois Governor Blagojevich, new governor Pat Quinn reopened the closed state parks in February. In March 2009 Quinn announced he is committed to reopening the state historic sites by June 30, 2009.

Notes

External links

References

State parks of Illinois
Protected areas of Shelby County, Illinois
Protected areas established in 1968
1968 establishments in Illinois